The Museum of Jewish Montreal (MJM) ( (MMJ)) is an online and mobile museum that collects, maps, and presents the history and experiences of the Montreal Jewish community through exhibits, walking tours and through online and mobile technology. It is located in Montreal, Quebec, Canada. It was founded in 2010 by Zev Moses, the museum's current director.

Activities
The Museum of Jewish Montreal was founded in 2010, when Montreal’s Jewish community turned 250 years old. What began as a project to map Montreal’s Jewish history has since expanded to include online exhibits, oral histories and online/mobile walking tours.

The MJM website features online exhibits with written descriptions of key institutions, events, places and people in the history of Montreal’s Jewish life. Each exhibit also features archival imagery and links to further research. Exhibits are intended to give users context about how different elements of the Jewish community’s history fit into the history of Montreal, Quebec, Canada and worldwide Jewish life. There are over 125 original exhibits along with various exhibits based on Sara Tauben’s research on historic synagogues in Montreal.

Beginning in 2013, MJM began curating digital exhibitions, including Between These Walls (January 2013), A Geography of Jewish Care (June 2013) and Work Upon Arrival (January 2014). The Museum began to curate pop-up exhibitions in February 2014, with its exhibition on garment workers "Parkley Clothing: 1937." "Sacrée / Profane - Samy Elmaghribi" about a Moroccan Jewish pop singer and cantor was exhibited in winter 2015.  MJM also organizes events, including lectures, panel discussions and other public programming.

In 2016, the museum acquired a physical storefront on 4040, boulevard Saint-Laurent (4040, Saint Laurent Boulevard). They operated on the ground-floor of a former garment industry factory called The Vineburg Building. In May 2020, however, the museum lost its physical space, but it plans to reopen further north on St. Laurent in early 2022.

Third Solitude Series
In October 2011, MJM began publishing The Third Solitude Series, a blog featuring in-depth interviews, research, literature, photo essays and personal stories relating to Montreal’s Jewish heritage. The 'Third Solitude' refers to a term sometimes used in academic contexts to the Jewish experience in Canada and in Montreal specifically, between French and English Canada. This name is based on author Hugh MacLennan's famous book about the French versus English divide in Montreal, titled Two Solitudes.

Stories Project
In 2012, MJM inaugurated the Stories Project, an oral history initiative that aims to collect the stories of members of the community with diverse backgrounds and experiences, to share the stories with broader society and to preserve them over the long-term. A web app allowing users to record stories and upload photos was launched in 2015.

Walking Tours

In June 2014, MJM began leading daily Jewish walking tours in the Plateau and Mile End neighbourhoods, and in June 2015, the Museum launched the "Beyond the Bagel" Jewish food tours. Currently, the museum offers four distinct walking tour narratives each about a different facet of Jewish life: Making Their Mark; Rabbis, Writers, and Radicals; Beyond the Bagel,  and In The Shadow of the Mountain. The Making Their Mark Walking Tour is offered both virtually and in-person.

See also
 Demographics of Montreal
 Saint Laurent Boulevard
 History of the Jews in Canada
 Jewish Museum
 List of museums in Quebec

References

External links
Museum of Jewish Montreal website
Le musée du Montréal juif website
 Third Solitude Series

Jewish museums in Canada
Jews and Judaism in Montreal
Museums in Montreal
Virtual museums